Bana Tchanilé is a former football coach, he has been in charge of the Togo national football team on at least two occasions, in 2000 and in 2004.

On 7 September 2010, Togo allegedly played Bahrain in a friendly losing the match 3–0. However, on 14 September, the Togo FA claimed that a fake team had played against Bahrain.

Bahrain's head coach Josef Hickersberger rated the match as a missed opportunity for his team to prepare for the West Asian Championships starting in September.

Togo's Sport Minister Christophe Tchao said to the Jeune Afrique magazine that nobody in Togo had "ever been informed of such a game". On 20 September 2010, it was revealed that Tchanilé was the culprit and the Togo FA have given him a three-year ban in addition to the two-year ban he got in July 2010 for taking Togo players to play a tournament in Egypt. The match fixing has been linked to Wilson Raj Perumal and the Singaporean match-fixing syndicate allegedly run by Tan Seet Eng.

He is the older brother of Tchakala Tchanilé.

References 

Togo national football team managers
Niger national football team managers
Living people
Year of birth missing (living people)
Togolese football managers
21st-century Togolese people